Lorenzo English (May 22, 1819 – March 14, 1888) was a Whig and later Republican politician from the U.S. state of Ohio. He served as the 20th mayor of Columbus, Ohio and the 18th person to serve in that office.  He served Columbus prior to the American Civil War for five terms spanning eleven years.  His successor was Wray Thomas after 1861.

Biography
He was born in Herkimer County, New York on May 22, 1819.  His parents were John and Laura S. English.  He attended the public schools in Herkimer county.  In 1837, his family moved to Mount Vernon, Ohio, then later to Columbus, Ohio.  He attended Oberlin College and graduated in August 1843.

Legacy and depictions
Lorenzo is depicted as a ghost and a "shadow man" in The Dead Files, an American paranormal television series, in Season 3, episode 11 titled, "Blood in the Bordello."  The television program was filmed at The Jury Room, a local pub in Columbus, Ohio.  The pub serves an alcoholic drink called Lorenzo's Revenge named after the former mayor.

References

Bibliography

Further reading

External links

Lorenzo English at Political Graveyard

1819 births
1888 deaths
Burials at Green Lawn Cemetery (Columbus, Ohio)
Mayors of Columbus, Ohio
Oberlin College alumni
Ohio Republicans
Ohio Whigs
19th-century American politicians